The 2000 United States Senate election in Nevada was held on November 7, 2000. Incumbent Democrat Richard Bryan decided to retire instead of seeking a third term. Republican nominee John Ensign won the open seat.

Democratic primary

Candidates

Results 
Bernstein was unopposed in the Democratic primary.

Republican primary

Candidates 
 John Ensign, former U.S. Representative and nominee for the United States Senate in 1998
 Richard Hamzik
 Fernando Platin, Jr.

Results

General election

Candidates 
 Ernie Berghof (IA)
 John Ensign (R), former U.S. Representative and nominee for the United States Senate in 1998
 Bill Grutzmacher (CF)
 J.J. Johnson (L)
 Kathryn Rusco (G)

Debates
Complete video of debate, October 10, 2000

Results

See also 
 2000 United States Senate elections

References 

Nevada
2000
2000 Nevada elections